Football at the 2019 Southeast Asian Games were held across three venues in the Philippines; the Rizal Memorial Stadium in Manila, Biñan Football Stadium in Biñan, Laguna, and the City of Imus Grandstand, Imus for the men's tournament. The women's tournament was held in Manila and Biñan.

Vietnam won gold in both men's and women's tournaments, beating Indonesia and Thailand respectively. The 2019 Southeast Asian Games also witnessed surprisingly amazing performances of Cambodia football.

Participating nations
A total of 336 athletes from 11 nations were scheduled to participate (the numbers of athletes are shown in parentheses). Teams from Indonesia, Malaysia, Myanmar, Thailand, Vietnam and hosts the Philippines entered both the men's and women's competition. All other teams played in men's tournament.

Competition schedule
The men's tournament is being held from 25 November to 10 December 2019 while the women's tournament was held from 26 November to 8 December 2019.

Venues
The men's tournament is primarily held in the Rizal Memorial Stadium in Manila. Individual seats and roofing were installed in the spectator's area outside the main grandstand for the Manila stadium. The Biñan Football Stadium in Biñan, Laguna, which hosted select men's football group matches, was the main venue for the women's tournament's group stage, with the latter matches played at Manila as well.

Aside from the two venues, the University of Makati Stadium as well as the pitches at the University of the Philippines, Far Eastern University Diliman, and Carmona are also designated as practice venues for the participating teams.

All venues used artificial turfs which caused a lot of injuries for football players during the tournaments.

Men's competition

Group stage 
All times are Philippine Standard Time (UTC+8).

Group A 
<onlyinclude>

Group B

Knockout stage

Winners

Women's competition

Group stage 
All times are Philippine Standard Time (UTC+8).

Group A

Group B

Knockout stage

Winners

Medal summary

Medal table

References

External links